Obsideo is the seventh studio album by Dutch death metal band Pestilence. It was released on October 21, 2013 via Candlelight Records. The album was produced by the vocalist/guitarist Patrick Mameli, and their last before their two-year hiatus from 2014 to 2016. According to Mameli, the album's overall lyrical theme is "the journey of the human soul." This is the final Pestilence album to feature lead and rhythm guitarist Patrick Uterwijk, who had been with the band since Consuming Impulse in 1989.

Track listing

Credits

Pestilence
Patrick Mameli - vocals, lead & rhythm guitar 
Patrick Uterwijk - lead & rhythm guitar 
George Maier - bass guitar
David Haley - drums

Production
Patrick Mameli - producer
Christian Moos - engineering, mixing
Tim Turan - mastering
Stefan Schipper - photography
Santiago Jaramillo - design, layout, art direction, cover art

References 

2013 albums
Pestilence (band) albums